Shinkai Zahine Karokhail is an Afghan politician and rights activist, focusing mainly on the political representation of women and the protection of vulnerable children. She was the Afghan ambassador to Canada.

Early life 
Mrs Karokhail was born to Pashtun parents in Kabul, Afghanistan, where she attended the Medical College of the Kabul University and graduated with a medical degree. Similarly, apart from medicine studying political science, she holds a diploma in English from the National Institute of Modern Languages of Islamabad, Pakistan. She speaks, Persian, Pashto, Urdu and English.

Political career 
Mrs Karokhail was elected Wolesi Jirga as an MP in 2005  to represent the people of Kabul in the National Assembly of the Islamic Republic of Afghanistan. She was re-elected in the 2010 parliamentary elections. Currently, she is the member of the Parliamentary Women Caucus committee and serves on the Budget and Finance Committee.

Mrs Karokhail has a vocal advocate of women's rights, alongside working tirelessly on conflict prevention programmes.

In 1991, she among others members founded the Afghan Women's Educational Center, initially taking its teaching responsibilities followed by various other posts during the later years. In 2002, she became the director of the NGO heading its developmental and management programmes.

Mrs. Karokhail played a pivotal role in opposing the controversial draft Shia Family Law, which was seen to be oppressing Shiite women and depriving them of many of their rights in a marital relationship. After making international headlines, a number of amendments  were made to the draft law in order to make it more acceptable.

Moreover, she was also one of the few voices behind the Elimination of Violence Against Women Bill which was approved by the President of Afghanistan in 2009. She was the only parliamentarian alongside other female leaders from various departments to be invited to witness the signing of the bill by President Hamid Karzai.

Interests 
Mrs. Karokhail focuses on development, economic Security, good governance, Justice and transparency, Human rights, regional cooperation & security, women, peace and security issues as well as lobbying for more women in the inner circle of power.

Awards 
In 2012, Mrs. Karokhail received the East West Institute's first ever H.H. Sheikha Fatima bint Mubarak Award  for Values-based Leadership.

References

External links 
 Afghan Women’s Educational Centre 
 Afghans’ Coalition for Transparency and Accountability 
 The Afghan Women’s Network  
 Peace Training and Research Organization

Afghanistan conflict (1978–present)
Pashtun women
21st-century Afghan women politicians
21st-century Afghan politicians
Members of the House of the People (Afghanistan)
People from Kabul
Living people
Year of birth missing (living people)
Afghan women ambassadors
Ambassadors of Afghanistan to Canada